Robert Allan Doughty (born November 4, 1943) is an American military historian and retired United States Army officer.

Early life 
Doughty was born in Tullos, Louisiana, on November 4, 1943, to parents John and Georgia Doughty.

Career 

He attended the United States Military Academy, graduating in 1965. Doughty subsequently completed a tour of duty in Germany before deploying to Vietnam in an advisory role in 1968. Upon his return to the United States, Doughty pursued graduate study, earning a master's degree from the University of California, Los Angeles in 1972, followed by a doctorate from the University of Kansas in 1979. From 1979 to 1981, Doughty served a second stint in Germany. In 1985, he was named head of the history department at West Point, and retired from the position in 2005. 

Doughty devoted much of his career to studying French military actions during the world wars. He held the Harold Keith Johnson Chair in Military History at the U.S. Army Military History Institute from 1995 to 1996.

Personal life 

He is the father of the singer-songwriter Mike Doughty

Awards and recognition 

In 1986, Doughty received the Paul Birdsall Prize from the American Historical Association.

Selected books

References

1943 births
Living people
American generals
People from LaSalle Parish, Louisiana
People from Winn Parish, Louisiana
Military personnel from Louisiana
United States Military Academy alumni
United States Military Academy faculty
20th-century American historians
21st-century American historians
University of Kansas alumni
University of California, Los Angeles alumni
American military historians
Historians of World War I
Historians of World War II
Historians of France
Historians from Louisiana